Genderless may refer to:

Agender, an identity for people who do not identify with any gender
Gender-neutral pronoun, a pronoun not associated with a particular gender
Genderless fashion in Japan, a Japanese fashion subculture
Genderless language, a natural or constructed human language that has no category of grammatical gender
Gonadal dysgenesis, or absolute genderless; individuals born without functional sex glands
Unisex, designating items or facilities for persons regardless of gender

See also
Intersex
Sexlessness (disambiguation)